Reductase kinase may refer to:
 Dephospho-(reductase kinase) kinase, an enzyme
 AMP-activated protein kinase, an enzyme